The Rugby-Bundesliga is the highest level of the league system for rugby union in Germany, organised by the German Rugby Federation.

The league is predominantly amateur, with only one club in the league being officially a professional outfit, the Heidelberger RK.

From 2012 to 2015 the Bundesliga was expanded from ten to 24 and the league divided into four regional divisions of six teams each. Below the Bundesliga the 2. Bundesliga was organised in a similar fashion. From 2015 onwards the league returned to sixteen clubs.

History

The German rugby championship was first played in 1909 and, with the exception of 2002, has always been determined by a final.

The Rugby-Bundesliga was first played in two divisions in the 1971-72 season and soon consisted of six teams in the North and ten teams in the South. However, of the eight southern teams, five were located in Heidelberg and after 1975 all northern teams were from Hanover. The founding members of the league were SV Odin Hannover, SV 1908 Ricklingen, DSV 1878 Hannover, TSV Victoria Linden, SC Siemensstadt and FC St. Pauli Rugby in the north and SC Neuenheim, RG Heidelberg, Heidelberger RK, Heidelberger TV, TSV Handschuhsheim, RC Hürth, Bonner SC, ASV Köln Rugby, SC 1880 Frankfurt and Eintracht Frankfurt Rugby.

The league has changed its format a number of times over the years. In 1997-98, it played as a single-division league with eight teams. From 1998 to 2001, it was divided into two regional divisions again. The top-three teams from each of the two divisions then qualified for the finals round, held in a home-and-away format. The top two teams out of this round then played the German Final in a home-and-away format. The bottom three teams in each division played a spring round together with the top three teams of the 2nd Rugby-Bundesliga to determine the clubs who would play in the Bundesliga in the next season.

Since 2001, the Bundesliga has been organised as a single division again with eight teams playing each other in a home-and-away season. The top two teams play each other in the championship final. In its first season, 2001–02, no final was held and the regular season winner was also the German champions. In the first 34 editions of the Final, there was always a team from Hanover present. Only in 2006 did this stop, and no team from Hanover has played in the final since.

Below the Bundesliga, two 2nd Bundesligas, north and south, form the second tier of the league system, with the winners promoted to the Bundesliga. The third tier of rugby is formed by the nine Regionalligen, regional leagues.

SC 1880 Frankfurt, the 2007-08 champions, had to wait 83 years for its fifth title, having last won the championship in 1925. The club is the only rugby club in Germany considered semi-professional.

On 19 July 2008 at the annual general meeting of the German rugby association, the DRV decided to expand the Bundesliga and slightly change its modus. It was decided to expand the league to nine teams for 2008-09 and ten teams for 2009-10, meaning only one club will be relegated in 2009, and two promoted. Also, the play-off format was changed, with four teams qualifying for the finals. At the bottom end, in 2008-09, the last two teams would determine one relegated club via playoff. From 2009-10, the bottom four clubs will play-off to determine two relegated teams.

The women's Rugby-Bundesliga consists of six teams in 2008 and also plays a final between the top two clubs at the end of the season.

As a sign of the gap between the Bundesliga and the 2nd Bundesliga, TSV Victoria Linden, who only won the 2009-10 North/East division in the last round of the championship, declined promotion, citing the additional cost of travelling and the limited player pool as their reason. The South/West champion, Stuttgarter RC, has also indicated that it would not take up promotion, leaving the Bundesliga with only eight clubs for the next season. It also meant, for the first time ever, that no club from Hanover would compete at the top level of German rugby. DSV 78 protested the decision to reduce the league to eight teams again and thereby relegating the club. The annual convention of the German Rugby Federation however decided in early July 2010 to allow DSV 78 to stay in the Bundesliga.

In February 2011, the DRV decided that the league would continue to play with ten teams in the near future.

In mid-July 2012 the Deutsche Rugby Tag, the annual general meeting of the DRV decided to approve a league reform proposed by German international Manuel Wilhelm. The new system saw the number of clubs in the Bundesliga increased from ten to 24, the league divided into four regional divisions of six clubs each and the finals series expanded from four to sixteen teams. One of the main aims of the reform was to reduce the number of kilometres travelled by individual teams and therefore reduce the travel expenses. The system will remain mostly unchanged for the 2013-14 season. The only changes will be a play-off between the fourth and fifth placed teams in each group after the first stage to determine the clubs advancing to the second stage. The championship play-offs after the second stage will be reduced from sixteen to twelve clubs with the top two teams in each group advancing directly to the quarter finals while the remaining eight will play a wild card round to determine the other four quarter finalists.

At the annual general meeting of the DRV in July 2015 it was decided to return to a sixteen club format with two regional divisions of eight. The last placed in each division would be relegated while the seventh placed teams would have to play-off against the third and fourth best team of the 2. Bundesliga. The German championship in turn will be contested by the best two teams in each group.

Clubs participating in 2018

Championship finals

The German rugby champions are determined by a final (except in 2001-02), currently contested by the two top teams of the Bundesliga:

Finals

Source:

Winners & Finalists
As of 2016, this is the standing in the all-time winners list of the Bundesliga:

League placings
Since 1998, the following clubs have played in the league. From 1999 to 2001, the league consisted of two regional divisions of six teams each. After an autumn (A) round, the top three from each group would reach the championship finals round in spring (S). The bottom three, together with the top three from each of the two 2nd Bundesligas would play a promotion round in spring with the top three in each group playing in the Bundesliga the following autumn. In 1997-98 and from 2001 to 2012, the league has been played in a single-division format. From 2012–13 to 2014–15 it had been divided into a first (I) and second round (II), followed by play-offs:

 1 DSV 78 Hannover and SV 08 Ricklingen fielded a combined team, the DSV 78/08 Ricklingen, from 2003 to 2009.
 2 Post SV Berlin Rugby left Post SV in 2003 to form RK 03 Berlin.
 3 TuS Wunsdorf and SV 08 Ricklingen fielded a combined team, the 08 Ricklingen/Wunsdorf, from 2012 onwards.

Key

Player statistics
The top try and point scorers in recent season were:

References

attendance 
Rugby Bundesliga has not got a lot of attendance

Total attendance for tournament = 10,221
average attendance for match = 50

External links 
 German Rugby Community
 German Rugby Federation website
 Scrum.de - Result archive
 Rugbyweb.de - Result archive

 
 
National rugby union premier leagues
1971 establishments in West Germany
Sports leagues established in 1971
Ger
Professional sports leagues in Germany